= Welsh Thrasher faith scam =

Financial scam

The Welsh Thrasher faith scam was a scam that targeted people of faith, operating as a Ponzi scheme.

It offered the "marks" or targets a combination of a tax avoidance entity (a corporate sole) and a high return investment program or deposit in a fictitious bank or other enterprise. The proposition at the core of the scam was promoted by an Englishman named Howard Welsh and a native of Virginia named Lee Hope Thrasher. Welsh and Thrasher allegedly received US$31,000,000 from about 900 people who believed themselves to be bona-fide investors in so-called "Living Your Sole Purpose" entities.

The FBI had been searching for them for two years and had placed them on its most wanted list when they were arrested by Scotland Yard in late 2004.

They signed a plea agreement on 11 October 2006.
